What Next? is a 1928 British silent comedy film directed by Walter Forde and starring Forde, Pauline Johnson and Frank Stanmore. It was made at Nettlefold Studios in Walton-on-Thames. There is a copy held at the BFI archive.

Premise
A man acquires a valuable artifact as a present for his girlfriend, inadvertently drawing a lunatic collector into pursuit of him.

Cast
 Walter Forde as Walter
 Pauline Johnson as Violet Chippendale
 Frank Stanmore as Cedric Chippendale
 Douglas Payne as Cornelius Vandergilt
 Charles Dormer as Nick Winterbottom
 Frank Perfitt as Septimus Vandergilt
 Ian Wilson as Wilson

References

Bibliography
 Low, Rachael. History of the British Film, 1918–1929. George Allen & Unwin, 1971.
 Wood, Linda. British Films, 1927–1939. British Film Institute, 1986.

External links

1928 films
1928 comedy films
British comedy films
British silent feature films
Films directed by Walter Forde
Films set in England
Films shot at Nettlefold Studios
British black-and-white films
Butcher's Film Service films
1920s English-language films
1920s British films
Silent comedy films